The Squamish-Lillooet Regional District is a quasi-municipal administrative area in British Columbia, Canada.  It stretches from Britannia Beach in the south to Pavilion in the north.  Lillooet, Pemberton, Whistler and Squamish are the four municipalities in the regional district.  Its administrative offices are in the Village of Pemberton, although the district municipalities of Squamish and Whistler are larger population centres. The district covers 16,353.68 km² (6,314.19 sq mi) of land area.

The southern end of the regional district comprises the northern part of the traditional territory of the Squamish people, and the northern half constitutes the traditional homeland of the St'at'imc people.

Demographics 

Note: Totals greater than 100% due to multiple origin responses.

Communities

Incorporated municipalities

Electoral Areas

Squamish-Lillooet Electoral Area A, British Columbia
Electoral Area A comprises the basin of the Bridge River valley above its confluence with the Yalakom River at Moha.  The only towns in the area are Bralorne, Gold Bridge and Brexton.  Other communities or localities include Gun Lake, Tyaughton Lake and Gun Creek Road.

Population as of 2016 Canadian Census: 186

Squamish-Lillooet Electoral Area B, British Columbia
Electoral Area B comprises the basin of the Bridge River below its confluence with the Yalakom River at Moha, the valley of Seton and Anderson Lakes (excepting D'Arcy), and the rest of the upper portion of the SLRD surrounding Lillooet and adjoining parts of the Fraser Canyon.  Communities include McGillivray Falls, Seton Portage, Shalalth, Texas Creek, Bridge River (meaning Moha and the lower Bridge River communities), West Pavilion, Pavilion and Fountain and Fountain Valley.

Population as of 2016 Canadian census: 363

Squamish-Lillooet Electoral Area C, British Columbia
Electoral Area C comprises the Pemberton and Gates Valleys and the valley of the Green River north of Whistler.  Communities include Pemberton Meadows, Mount Currie, Owl Creek, Birken, Devine, D'Arcy, and McGillivray (formerly McGillivray Falls).

Population as of 2016 Canadian Census: 1663

Squamish-Lillooet Electoral Area D, British Columbia
Electoral Area D comprises the valleys of the Cheakamus and Squamish Rivers and the Sea-to-Sky Corridor south to the SLRD boundary on Howe Sound.  Communities include Britannia Beach, Woodfibre, Furry Creek, the Pinecrest and Black Tusk subdivisions nearer Whistler and the uninhabited former recreational settlement of Garibaldi.

Population as of 2016 Canada Census: 1057

Notes

References
Notes

Sources
Community Profile: Squamish-Lillooet Regional District, British Columbia; Statistics Canada

External links

 
Squamish-Lillooet
Southern Interior of British Columbia
South Coast of British Columbia